Jillian Weir (born 9 February 1993) is a Canadian hammer thrower of Mohawk descent. She competed in the women's hammer throw at the 2017 World Championships in Athletics. In July 2021, Weir qualified to compete at the 2020 Summer Olympics. She competed at the 2022 Commonwealth Games, in Women's hammer throw, winning a bronze medal.

Weir's father, Robert Weir represented Great Britain in the discus and hammer throw, winning multiple Commonwealth Games medals.

References

External links

Oregon Ducks profile

1993 births
Living people
Canadian female hammer throwers
World Athletics Championships athletes for Canada
Place of birth missing (living people)
Athletes (track and field) at the 2018 Commonwealth Games
Commonwealth Games competitors for Canada
Athletes (track and field) at the 2019 Pan American Games
Pan American Games track and field athletes for Canada
Sportspeople from Sunnyvale, California
Oregon Ducks women's track and field athletes
First Nations sportspeople
Athletes (track and field) at the 2020 Summer Olympics
Olympic track and field athletes of Canada
Commonwealth Games bronze medallists for Canada
Commonwealth Games medallists in athletics
Athletes (track and field) at the 2022 Commonwealth Games
Medallists at the 2022 Commonwealth Games